The Puerto Rico women's national football team is governed by the Puerto Rican Football Federation (FPF).

History
On 30 August 2018, in a home friendly versus Argentina, players staged a protest against the Puerto Rican Football Federation over an alleged lack of support and financial transparency.

Team image

Nicknames
The Puerto Rico women's national football team has been known or nicknamed as "Las Boricuas (The Boricuas)".

Home stadium
Puerto Rico plays its home matches among various stadiums.

Results and fixtures

The following is a list of match results in the last 12 months, as well as any future matches that have been scheduled.

Legend

2021

2022

Puerto Rico Results and Fixtures – Soccerway.com

Head-to-head record

Source: FIFA

Staff

Coaching staff

Manager history

 Carlos Avedissian (2015–2016)
 Shek Borkowski (2017–2018)
 David Guillemat (2018–2019)
  Juan Carlos Parra (2019–2021)
  Chris Brown (2021)
  Nat González (2021–)

Players

Current squad
The following players were called up for the matches against Antigua and Barbuda and Anguilla on February 16 and 19, 2022, respectively.

Caps and goals are current as of June 16, 2019, after the match against .

|-----
! colspan="9" bgcolor="#FFDEAD" align="left" | Goalkeeper
|----- bgcolor="#FFECCE"

|-----
! colspan="9" bgcolor="#B0D3FB" align="left" | Defender
|----- bgcolor="#E7FAEC"

|-----
! colspan="9" bgcolor="#BBF0C9" align="left" | Midfielder
|----- bgcolor="#DFEDFD"

|-----
! colspan="9" bgcolor="#FFACB3" align="left" | Forward
|----- bgcolor="#FFD2D6"

|-----
! colspan="9" bgcolor="#FFACB3" align="left" | Unknown
|----- bgcolor="#FFD2D6"

(Players are listed within position group by kit number, order of caps, then alphabetically)

Recent call-ups
The following players have also been called up to the Puerto Rican squad within the last 12 months.

|-----
! colspan="9" bgcolor="#FFDEAD" align="left" | Goalkeeper
|----- bgcolor="#FFECCE"

|-----
! colspan="9" bgcolor="#B0D3FB" align="left" | Defender
|----- bgcolor="#E7FAEC"

|-----
! colspan="9" bgcolor="#BBF0C9" align="left" | Midfielder
|----- bgcolor="#DFEDFD"

|-----
! colspan="9" bgcolor="#FFACB3" align="left" | Forward
|----- bgcolor="#FFD2D6"

Notes:
 = Alternate
 = Withdrew due to an injury.
 = Preliminary roster
 = Retired from the national team.

(Players are listed within position group by order of latest call-up, caps, and then alphabetically)

Records

Most capped players

Top goalscorers

Competitive record

FIFA Women's World Cup

*Draws include knockout matches decided on penalty kicks.

Olympic Games

*Draws include knockout matches decided on penalty kicks.

CONCACAF W Championship

*Draws include knockout matches decided on penalty kicks.

Pan American Games

*Draws include knockout matches decided on penalty kicks.

Central American and Caribbean Games

*Draws include knockout matches decided on penalty kicks.

CFU Women's Caribbean Cup

*Draws include knockout matches decided on penalty kicks.

See also

Sport in Puerto Rico
Football in Puerto Rico
Women's football in Puerto Rico
Puerto Rico women's national under-20 football team
Puerto Rico women's national under-17 football team
Puerto Rico men's national football team
Puerto Rico men's national under-20 football team
Puerto Rico men's national under-17 football team
Puerto Rico men's national beach soccer team

References

External links
Puerto Rico women's national football team official website 
Puerto Rico Profile at FIFA.com

Puerto Rico women's national football team